Kalli Dakos (born June 16, 1950) is a Canadian children's poet and teacher. She was born in Ottawa, Ontario, Canada and graduated from Queen's University, earning BAH and BEd degrees.

Bibliography
1995:If You're Not Here, Please Raise Your Hand: Poems About School 
1997:Get Out of the Alphabet Number 2: Wacky Wednesday Puzzle Poems
1996:The Goof Who Invented Homework and Other School Poems
1998:Don't Read This Book, Whatever You Do! More Poems About School 
1999:Mrs. Cole on an Onion Roll 
2000:"The Greatest Magic: Poems for Teachers" (Only available for distribution through school markets)
2002:The Bug in Teacher's Coffee and Other School Poems 
2004:Our Principal Promised to Kiss a Pig (with Alice Desmarteau)
2006:Put Your Eyes Up Here and Other School Poems 
2010:"I Heard You Twice the First Time" 
2011:"A Funeral in The Bathroom"

References

1950 births
Living people
Canadian women children's writers
Canadian women poets
Writers from Ottawa
20th-century Canadian poets
21st-century Canadian poets
20th-century Canadian women writers
21st-century Canadian women writers